Andrew Duncan (born 1989) is an international lawn and indoor bowler from Northern Ireland.

Bowls career
In 2015, he won the silver medal at the prestigious Hong Kong International Bowls Classic.

He won the Irish National indoor title, which qualified him to represent the combined Irish team at the 2022 World Bowls Indoor Championships.

References

Male lawn bowls players from Northern Ireland
1989 births
Living people